The New Orleans Ads were a Negro Southern League (NSL) baseball team in 1920 based in New Orleans, Louisiana. The team was started by Fred Caulfield, a local backer, and the team is often referred to in newspapers as the Caulfield Ads.

While the NSL was regarded as a minor league throughout most of its existence, with the collapse of the first Negro National League in 1932, the league is considered a major league for that one season.

The team played opposite days from the white New Orleans Pelicans team at Pelican Stadium.

See also
List of Negro league baseball teams

References

External links
1920 New Orleans Ads Calendar

Negro league baseball teams
Baseball teams established in 1920
Defunct minor league baseball teams
Ads
Professional baseball teams in Louisiana
Defunct baseball teams in Louisiana
Baseball teams disestablished in 1920